() is a district of the city of Putian, Fujian province, People's Republic of China.

Administrative divisions
Subdistricts:
Xialin Subdistrict, Fenghuangshan Subdistrict, Longqiao Subdistrict

Towns:
Changtai, Huating, Lingchuan, Donghai

References

External links

County-level divisions of Fujian
Putian